Kristoffer Forgaard Paulsen (born 31 January 2004) is a Norwegian footballer who plays as a centre-back for Viking FK.

Career
Forgaard Paulsen joined the academy of Viking at the age of 5. On 27 August 2020, he signed a three-year contract with the club. On 28 November 2020, at the age of 16, he made his Eliteserien debut in a 4–1 win against Start. Forgaard Paulsen has featured for the Norwegian national under-15 and under-16 teams.

Career statistics

References

External links
 Profile for Viking FK

2004 births
Living people
Sportspeople from Stavanger
Norwegian footballers
Viking FK players
Eliteserien players
Association football defenders
Norway youth international footballers